Chrysochlorosia is a genus of moths in the subfamily Arctiinae. The genus was erected by George Hampson in 1900.

Species
 Chrysochlorosia callistia
 Chrysochlorosia magnifica
 Chrysochlorosia splendida
 Chrysochlorosia superba

References

External links

Lithosiini
Moth genera